Kirstie Louise Gordon (born 20 October 1997) is a Scottish cricketer who currently plays for Kent, The Blaze and Birmingham Phoenix as a slow-left arm orthodox bowler. She played for Scotland from 2012 to 2017, before switching nationality to England for the 2018 ICC Women's World Twenty20 tournament. She has previously played for Nottinghamshire, Loughborough Lightning and Otago.

Early life
Gordon was born in Huntly, Aberdeenshire, Scotland, on 20 October 1997. As a youngster, she represented the North of Scotland at football and tennis. She began to play junior cricket at school and at Huntly Cricket Club. She progressed to play with the Huntly men's 
first XI aged 14, taking four wickets on debut.

Career
Gordon made her debut for the Scotland women's national cricket team aged 14 in May 2012, in a Women's County Championship match against Gloucestershire, and established herself as a regular member of the team. In 2014 she was named Scotland's under-17 player, batter and bowler of the year. Her first appearances against international opposition came at the 2015 ICC Women's World Twenty20 Qualifier event.

In 2015, Gordon moved to England to study for a Sports Science and Management degree at Loughborough University, while also playing county cricket for Nottinghamshire Women. This first brought her to the attention of coaches at the Loughborough-based England Women's Academy.

Gordon played for Scotland in the 2017 Women's Cricket World Cup Qualifier in February 2017. In the tournament, she was the highest wicket-taker for Scotland, with eight dismissals.

Gordon was offered a part-time contract as a talent identification player with Loughborough Lightning ahead of the 2018 Women's Cricket Super League season. As this was dependent on her not being classed as an overseas player, she was obliged to give up her qualification to play for Scotland in order to accept. She described her change of national status as a "massive risk". Now eligible to represent England, she was named in the squad for the 2018 ICC Women's World Twenty20 tournament. She made her Women's Twenty20 International (WT20I) debut for England against Bangladesh women on 12 November 2018, taking three wickets for sixteen runs.

The International Cricket Council (ICC) named Gordon as one of the five breakout stars in women's cricket in 2018.

In July 2019, Gordon was named in England's squad for their one-off Test match against Australia, as part of the Women's Ashes. She made her Test debut for England against Australia women on 18 July 2019.

In November 2019, she was named in England's Women's One Day International (WODI) squad for their series against Pakistan. On 18 June 2020, Gordon was named in a squad of 24 players to begin training ahead of international women's fixtures starting in England following the COVID-19 pandemic.

In January 2020, Gordon left Nottinghamshire after four years to sign for Kent. She returned to Loughborough as part of the Lightning squad for the opening rounds of the 2020 Rachael Heyhoe Flint Trophy. In 2021, she was the leading wicket-taker in the Rachael Heyhoe Flint Trophy, with 16 wickets. At the end of the 2021 season, it was announced that Gordon had signed a professional contract with Lightning, having missed out on an England central contract earlier that year. She also played for Birmingham Phoenix in the first season of The Hundred.

In December 2021, Gordon was named in England's A squad for their tour to Australia, with the matches being played alongside the Women's Ashes. In April 2022, she was bought by the Birmingham Phoenix for the 2022 season of The Hundred. In January 2023, Gordon signed for Otago Sparks for the remainder of the Super Smash.

References

External links
 
 

1997 births
Living people
Alumni of Loughborough University
Birmingham Phoenix cricketers
Cricketers from Aberdeenshire
England women Test cricketers
England women Twenty20 International cricketers
English women cricketers
Kent women cricketers
The Blaze women's cricketers
Loughborough Lightning cricketers
Nottinghamshire women cricketers
Otago Sparks cricketers
People from Huntly
Scottish women cricketers